Joseph Angelo Grech (10 December 1948 – 28 December 2010) was an Australian prelate of the Catholic Church. He was the Bishop of Sandhurst from 2001 to 2010.

Grech was born in Balzan, Malta, on 10 December 1948. After studies in the local schools, he moved to Melbourne, Australia, where he continued his studies. He was ordained a priest on 30 November 1974 in his home town, before returning to Melbourne to take up parish duties. He became an auxiliary bishop of the Melbourne archdiocese in 1998.

On 8 March 2001, he was appointed the Bishop of Sandhurst, based in the regional Victorian city of Bendigo. He was installed on 27 April and served in that position until his death from a blood disorder on 28 December 2010.

References

External links

1948 births
2010 deaths
Maltese emigrants to Australia
21st-century Roman Catholic bishops in Australia
Deaths from blood disease
Roman Catholic bishops of Sandhurst